Sybra acutipennis is a species of beetle in the family Cerambycidae. It was described by Breuning in 1951.

References

acutipennis
Beetles described in 1951